The 1936 World Table Tennis Championships women's singles was the tenth edition of the women's singles championship.
Ruth Aarons defeated Astrid Krebsbach  in the final by three sets to nil, to win the title.

Results

See also
List of World Table Tennis Championships medalists

References

-
-